The 1969 Dwars door België was the 25th edition of the Dwars door Vlaanderen cycle race and was held on 25 March 1969. The race started and finished in Waregem. The race was won by Eric Leman.

General classification

References

1969
1969 in road cycling
1969 in Belgian sport